Haemophilus influenzae cellulitis is a cutaneous condition characterized by a distinctive bluish or purplish-red cellulitis of the face.

See also 
 Haemophilus influenzae
 Skin lesion

References 

Bacterium-related cutaneous conditions